Franco Daniel Mendoza (born 18 August 1981 in Sunchales) is an Argentine football striker currently playing for Ben Hur.

Mendoza started his playing career in 2000 with Atlético de Rafaela in the Argentine 2nd division. In 2002-2003 the club won the league and obtained promotion to the Argentine Primera. Atlético were relegated after one season, but Mendoza stayed on with the club until 2005.

Mendoza was signed by Primera division side Banfield in 2005, he then joined  Godoy Cruz in 2006 and Mexican club Atlante in 2007.

Mendoza joined newly promoted Huracán in 2007, and helped the club to finish in the top half of the table in the Apertura 2007, and finished as the clubs topscorer in the tournament.

On 2009 Mendoza joined Ecuadorian Emelec.

Mendoza has become known for coming off the bench in the 2nd half of tied games and delivering the knockout goal for his team both in the local tournament and in la Copa Sudamericana 2009.

Titles

References

External links
 Argentine Primera statistics
 Football-Lineups player profile

1981 births
Living people
People from Castellanos Department
Argentine footballers
Association football forwards
Atlético de Rafaela footballers
Club Atlético Banfield footballers
Godoy Cruz Antonio Tomba footballers
Atlante F.C. footballers
Club Atlético Huracán footballers
Club Olimpia footballers
C.S. Emelec footballers
Arsenal de Sarandí footballers
Club de Gimnasia y Esgrima La Plata footballers
Deportes Concepción (Chile) footballers
Primera B de Chile players
Expatriate footballers in Chile
Expatriate footballers in Mexico
Expatriate footballers in Paraguay
Expatriate footballers in Ecuador
Expatriate footballers in Peru
Sportspeople from Santa Fe Province